Ricardo Edmundo Izurieta Caffarena (11 June 1943 – 17 August 2014) was a Chilean military officer and Commander-in-Chief of the Army between 1998 and 2002. Izurieta was a key figure in managing civil-military relations as Chile worked to consolidate democracy in the years after the military government of Augusto Pinochet.

A cavalry officer by training, Izurieta was a captain at the time of the September 1973 coup against the government of Salvador Allende, but played no substantial role in the coup. During his career he served as a military professor, Director of the  Academia de Guerra del Ejército, and military attache to Israel and the United States. Thirty years' Pinochet's junior, Izurieta took command of the Chilean Army from Pinochet in March 1998 and was the senior military figure during the 1998-2000 Caso Pinochet, in which the former dictator was placed under house arrest in London under indictment by a Spanish judge. Izurieta met Pinochet's plane upon his return from London and embraced the aging dictator as he stood up from the wheelchair in which he had remained in London.

Izurieta played an important role in moving the Chilean armed forces beyond the Pinochet era and working with Concertacion governments to address the legacy of human rights abuses. Izurieta proved a controversial figure to the left for the respect he showed to Pinochet and to the right for not defending Pinochet from those seeking justice for the brutality of the dictatorship. Izurieta and his 1998-2002 term at the head of the Chilean Army navigated such a critical period in the consolidation of Chilean democracy that some termed Izurieta an "eje de cambio" or axis of change for post-authoritarian Chile.

Awards

References

1947 births
2014 deaths
Chilean Army generals
Recipients of the Order of Military Merit (Brazil)